Lessonia may refer to:
 Lessonia (alga), a genus in the family Lessoniaceae
 Lessonia (bird), a genus in the family Tyrannidae
 Lessonia, a synonym for Aglaura, a genus of hydrozoans